The Men's up to 60 kg judo competition at the 2004 Summer Paralympics was held on 18 September at the Ano Liossia Olympic Hall.

The tournament bracket consisted of a single-elimination contest culminating in a gold medal match. There was also a repechage to determine the winners of the two bronze medals. Each judoka who had lost to a semifinalist competed in the repechage. The two judokas who lost in the semifinals faced the winner of the opposite half of the bracket's repechage in bronze medal bouts.

The competition winner on the day was Sergio Arturo Perez, representing . However, he tested positive for the prohibited anti-inflammatory drug prednisolone, received a warning and reprimand and lost his results and his gold medal. It does not appear that the minor medalists were promoted in consequence of this.

Results
The four digits represent scores of ippon, waza-ari, yuko and koka (which was still used at the time). A letter indicates a penalty of shido, chui, keikoku or hansoku make, which (at the time) also registered a score of koka, yuko, waza-ari or ippon, respectively, to the opponent. Penalties are escalated, thus 2 shido = chui, 3 shido = keikoku, 4 shido = hansoku make, save that a penalty of hansoku make direct results in exclusion from the remainder of the competition, while if it results from escalation it does not.

Competition bracket

Repechage

References

External links
 

M60
Judo at the Summer Paralympics Men's Extra Lightweight